Chicabal is a  inactive volcano in the Quetzaltenango department of Guatemala. The volcano has a crater lake, Chicabal Lake, and is constructed within a collapse scar that may have been the consequence of a failure of a previous edifice. It is associated with Santa Maria volcano.

References

Mountains of Guatemala
Subduction volcanoes
Stratovolcanoes of Guatemala
Quetzaltenango Department